Wrigley Bluffs is a rock bluffs 4 nautical miles (7 km) long, standing 3 nautical miles (6 km) north of Mount Cross in Anderson Hills in northern Patuxent Range, Pensacola Mountains. Mapped by United States Geological Survey (USGS) from surveys and U.S. Navy air photos, 1956–66. Named by Advisory Committee on Antarctic Names (US-ACAN) for Richard J. Wrigley, equipment operator at Palmer Station, winter 1966.

Cliffs of Queen Elizabeth Land